National Liberal Party-Câmpeanu was a national liberal, conservative liberal, and classical liberal political party in Romania which was established as a split-off from the main National Liberal Party (PNL) during the mid 1990s by former first PNL re-founding president Radu Câmpeanu in the wake of the violent and bloody 1989 Romanian Revolution.

Radu Câmpeanu decided to leave the main PNL from several main reasons, among which, most notably, there were his presidency loss at the congress in 1993 in front of Mircea Ionescu-Quintus (yet the former was elected vice-president of the party at the same congress nevertheless) and his reluctance and opposition towards the Romanian Democratic Convention (CDR) with respect to the incorporation of the Democratic Alliance of Hungarians in Romania (UDMR/RMDSZ) on common lists for the 1992 general election.

PNL-C, the official abbreviation under which the political party was known, competed in the 1996 and 2000 Romanian general and local elections before being re-integrating in the main PNL through the process of absorption in 2003, one year before the 2004 general election. During both the late 1990s and early 2000s, the party failed to enter the parliament's afferent legislatures for those periods and consequently remained in extra-parliamentary opposition towards both the CDR and PDSR from 1996 until 2003.

History
PNL-C was founded in 1993 as a splinter from the main PNL by Radu Câmpeanu along with a loyal and devoted group of fellow national liberal supporters dissatisfied with the result from the 1993 PNL congress. Between the mid 1990s and late 1990s, PNL-C refused to be a part of the Romanian Democratic Convention (CDR) and remained in extra-parliamentary opposition towards both the red quadrilateral coalition headed by FDSN Prime Minister Nicolae Văcăroiu and the subsequent CDR-led coalition successively headed by Victor Ciorbea, Radu Vasile, and Mugur Isărescu.

PNL-C contested the 1996 Romanian general election, the 1996 Romanian local elections, the 2000 Romanian general election, and the 2000 Romanian local elections, failing nevertheless to obtain major political scores at any of the aforementioned election rounds.

In 1996, Radu Câmpeanu ran once again for president under the National Liberal Ecologist Alliance but obtained a very feeble 0.35% share of the total ballots cast back then (or, in absolute numbers, 43,319 votes).

Electoral history

Presidential elections

Legislative elections

Notes:

1 ANLE stands for Romanian Alianța Național Liberal Ecologistă which PNL-C established along with the Ecologist Party (PER) at some point before the 1996 Romanian general election

Local elections
At the 1996 Romanian local elections, PNL-C won a very feeble number of only 15 mayoral mandates all across Romania. Likewise, for the 2000 Romanian local elections, PNL-C obtained modest results.

References

National Liberal Party
Conservative parties in Romania
Liberal parties in Romania
1993 establishments in Romania